Jason Ramond Maxwell (born March 26, 1972) is an American former professional baseball player. Primarily an infielder, Maxwell first played in 1998 for the Chicago Cubs. Maxwell played the 2000 and 2001 seasons with the Minnesota Twins. Maxwell attended Marshall County High School in Lewisburg, Tn where he played high school baseball for the Tigers. Maxwell is now the head Baseball coach for Ensworth High School (private) in Nashville, TN. Maxwell's favorite memories on his MLB career were interacting with his fans. He had a large following that was lead from a group of guys out of Swanton Ohio. He would often spend time with the guys after the games signing autographs for these kids. He donated bats, batting gloves, and even his belt with them.

References 

Major League Baseball infielders
Chicago Cubs players
Minnesota Twins players
Huntington Cubs players
Daytona Cubs players
Orlando Cubs players
Orlando Rays players
Iowa Cubs players
Toledo Mud Hens players
Fort Myers Miracle players
Gulf Coast Twins players
Louisville Bats players
Durham Bulls players
Baseball players from Tennessee
1972 births
Living people
Middle Tennessee Blue Raiders baseball players
People from Lewisburg, Tennessee